Elbahlul Issa Ramadan Abusahmin (born 12 September 1993) is a Libyan footballer who last played for Métlaoui.

Career statistics

Club

Notes

References

1993 births
Living people
Libyan footballers
Libyan expatriate footballers
Association football midfielders
ES Métlaoui players
Expatriate footballers in Tunisia
Libyan expatriate sportspeople in Tunisia